Throughout the majority of Christian history, most Christian theologians and denominations have considered homosexual behavior as immoral or sinful. Today, within Christianity, there are a variety of views on sexual orientation and homosexuality. Even within a denomination, individuals and groups may hold different views, and not all members of a denomination necessarily support their church's views on homosexuality. The Catholic church and Orthodox churches officially condemn homosexual activity as sin. Various Mainline Protestant denominations have taken a supportive stance towards blessing homosexual clergy and same sex marriage while others have not.

History 

The Hebrew Bible and its traditional interpretations in Judaism and Christianity have historically affirmed and endorsed a patriarchal and heteronormative approach towards human sexuality, favouring exclusively penetrative vaginal intercourse between men and women within the boundaries of marriage over all other forms of human sexual activity, including autoeroticism, masturbation, oral sex, non-penetrative and non-heterosexual sexual intercourse (all of which have been labeled as "sodomy" at various times). They have believed and taught that such behaviors are forbidden because they are considered sinful, and further compared to or derived from the behavior of the alleged residents of Sodom and Gomorrah. However, the status of LGBT people in early Christianity is debated.

The history of Christianity and homosexuality has been much debated. Some maintain that the early Christian churches deplored transgender people and same-sex relationships, while others maintain that they accepted them on the level of their heterosexual counterparts. These disagreements concern, in some cases, the translations of certain terms, or the meaning and context of some biblical passages.

This article focuses on the twentieth and twenty-first centuries, covering how the extent to which the Bible mentions the subject, whether or not it is condemned, and whether the various passages apply today, have become contentious topics. Significant debate has arisen over the proper interpretation of the Levitical code; the narrative of Sodom and Gomorrah; and various Pauline passages, and whether these verses condemn same-sex sexual activities.

Christian denominational positions

Catholic Church

The Catholic Church views as sinful any sexual act not related to procreation by a couple joined in marriage. The Church states that "homosexual tendencies" are "objectively disordered", but does not consider the tendency itself to be sinful but rather a temptation toward sin.

The Catechism of the Catholic Church states that "men and women who have deep-seated homosexual tendencies ... must be accepted with respect, compassion, and sensitivity" and that "every sign of unjust discrimination in their regard should be avoided." The Church opposes criminal penalties against homosexuality. The Catholic Church requires those who are attracted to people of the same (or opposite) sex to practise chastity, because it teaches that sexuality should only be practised within marriage, which includes chaste sex as permanent, procreative, heterosexual, and monogamous. The Vatican distinguishes between "deep-seated homosexual tendencies" and the "expression of a transitory problem", in relation to ordination to the priesthood; saying in a 2005 document that homosexual tendencies "must be clearly overcome at least three years before ordination to the diaconate." A 2011 report based on telephone surveys of self-identified American Catholics conducted by the Public Religion Research Institute found that 56% believe that sexual relations between two people of the same sex are not sinful. Research indicates that the Catholic Church's teachings on sexuality are "a major source of conflict and distress" to LGBT Catholics.

In January 2018 German bishop Franz-Josef Bode of the Roman Catholic Diocese of Osnabrück, and in February 2018 German Roman Catholic cardinal Reinhard Marx, chairman of the German Bishops' Conference said in interviews with German journalists that blessing of same-sex unions is possible in Roman Catholic churches in Germany. In Austria blessing of same sex unions is performed in two churches located in the Roman Catholic Diocese of Linz. In 2021, the Congregation for the Doctrine of the Faith clarified that same-sex civil unions cannot be blessed.

On March 11, 2023, the Synodal Path with support of over 80 percentage of German Roman Catholic bishops allowed blessing ceremonies for same-sex couples in all 27 German Roman Catholic diocese.

Orthodox churches
The Eastern Orthodox churches condemn homosexual acts. The Orthodox Church shares a long history of Church teachings and canon law with the Catholic Church and has a similar conservative stance on homosexuality. Some Orthodox Church jurisdictions, such as the Orthodox Church in America, have taken the approach of welcoming people with "homosexual feelings and emotions", while encouraging them to work towards "overcoming its harmful effects in their lives", while not allowing the sacraments to people who seek to justify homosexual activity. Other Orthodox Churches, such as those in Eastern Europe and Greece, view homosexuality less favourably. The Greek Orthodox Archdiocese lists homosexuality along with fornication, adultery, and more because of the thinking that homosexuality breaks up the institution of marriage and family. A 2017 Pew Research Center poll found that the majority of Orthodox Christians in the Eastern European and former USSR states surveyed believe that homosexuality "should not be accepted by society"; 45% of Orthodox Christians in Greece and 31% in the United States answered the same way.

Protestant churches

Liberal position
Certain other Christian denominations do not view monogamous same-sex relationships as sinful or immoral, and may bless such unions and consider them marriages. These include the United Church of Canada, the Presbyterian Church (USA), the United Church of Christ, all German Lutheran, reformed and united churches in EKD, all Swiss reformed churches, the Protestant Church in the Netherlands, the United Protestant Church in Belgium, the United Protestant Church of France, the Church of Denmark, the Church of Sweden, the Church of Iceland, the Church of Norway, and the Uniting Church in Australia. The Evangelical Lutheran Church of Finland also allows prayer for same-sex couples. The Metropolitan Community Church was founded specifically to serve the Christian LGBT community. The Global Alliance of Affirming Apostolic Pentecostals (GAAAP) traces its roots back to 1980, making it the oldest LGBT-affirming Apostolic Pentecostal denomination in existence. Another such organization is the Affirming Pentecostal Church International, currently the largest affirming Pentecostal organization, with churches in the US, UK, Central and South America, Europe and Africa.

LGBT-affirming denominations regard homosexuality as a natural occurrence. The United Church of Christ celebrates gay marriage, and some parts of the Anglican and Lutheran churches allow for the blessing of gay unions. The United Church of Canada also allows same-sex marriage, and views sexual orientation as a gift from God. Within the Anglican Communion, there are openly gay clergy; for example, Gene Robinson is an openly gay Bishop in the US Episcopal Church. Within the Lutheran communion, there are openly gay clergy, too; for example, bishop Eva Brunne is an openly lesbian Bishop in the Church of Sweden. Such religious groups and denominations interpret scripture and doctrine in a way that leads them to accept that homosexuality is morally acceptable, and a natural occurrence. For example, in 1988 the United Church of Canada, that country's largest Protestant denomination, affirmed that "a) All persons, regardless of their sexual orientation, who profess Jesus Christ and obedience to Him, are welcome to be or become full members of the Church; and b) All members of the Church are eligible to be considered for the Ordered Ministry." In 2000, the Church's General Assembly further affirmed that "human sexual orientations, whether heterosexual or homosexual, are a gift from God and part of the marvelous diversity of creation."

In addition, some Christian denominations such as the Moravian Church, believe that the Bible speaks negatively of homosexual acts but, as research on the matter continues, the Moravian Church seeks to establish a policy on homosexuality and the ordination of homosexuals. In 2014, Moravian Church in Europe allowed blessings of same-sex unions.

Liberal Quakers, those in membership of Britain Yearly Meeting and Friends General Conference in the US approve of same-sex marriage and union. Quakers were the first Christian group in the United Kingdom to advocate for equal marriage and Quakers in Britain formally recognised same-sex relationships in 1963.

The United Methodist Church elected a lesbian bishop in 2016, and on 7 May 2018, the Council of Bishops proposed the One Church Plan, which would allow individual pastors and regional church bodies to decide whether to ordain LGBT clergy and perform same-sex weddings. On 26 February 2019, a special session of the General Conference rejected the One Church Plan and voted to strengthen its official opposition to same-sex marriages and ordaining openly LGBT clergy.

Various positions

Anglican 

Since 1998, the Anglican Church has reassured people with same sex attraction they are loved by God and are welcomed as full members of the Body of Christ. The Church leadership has a variety of views in regard to homosexual expression and ordination. Some expressions of sexuality are considered sinful including "promiscuity, prostitution, incest, pornography, paedophilia, predatory sexual behaviour, and sadomasochism (all of which may be heterosexual and homosexual)". The Church is concerned with pressures on young people to engage sexually and encourages abstinence. 

At the Thirteenth Lambeth Conference in 1998, homosexuality was the most hotly debated issue. It was finally decided, by a vote of 526–70, to pass a resolution (1.10) calling for a "listening process" but stating (in an amendment passed by a vote of 389–190) that "homosexual practice" (not necessarily orientation) is "incompatible with Scripture". Reflecting on resolution 1.10 in the lead up to Lambeth 2022, Angela Tilby recalled the intervention of Bishop Michael Bourke, who successfully proposed an amendment which said: "We commit ourselves to listen to the experience of homosexual persons". Tilby considered that while the amendment had appeared inconsequential at the time, it had indeed been significant: she said that the idea of "patient listening" underpinned the Church of England's process "Living in Love and Faith".

Lutheran 

Churches within Lutheranism hold stances on the issue ranging from labeling homosexual acts as sinful, to acceptance of homosexual relationships. For example, the Lutheran Church–Missouri Synod, the Lutheran Church of Australia, and the Wisconsin Evangelical Lutheran Synod recognize homosexual behavior as intrinsically sinful and seek to minister to those who are struggling with homosexual inclinations. However, the Church of Sweden, the Church of Denmark, the Church of Norway, or Lutheran churches of the Evangelical Church in Germany conducts same-sex marriages, while the Evangelical Lutheran Church in America and Evangelical Lutheran Church in Canada opens the ministry of the church to gay pastors and other professional workers living in committed relationships. The Ethiopian Evangelical Church Mekane Yesus, the Lutheran denomination in Ethiopia, and second largest non-united Lutheran denomination in the world, however, has taken a stand that marriage is inherently between a man and a woman, and has formally broken fellowship with the ELCA.

Conservative position
Some mainline Protestant denominations, such as the African Methodist churches, the Reformed Church in America, and the Presbyterian Church in America, Christian Reformed Church in North America have a conservative position on the subject.

The Seventh-day Adventist Church "recognizes that every human being is valuable in the sight of God, and seeks to minister to all men and women [including homosexuals] in the spirit of Jesus," while maintaining that homosexual sex itself is forbidden in the Bible. "Jesus affirmed the dignity of all human beings and reached out compassionately to persons and families suffering the consequences of sin. He offered caring ministry and words of solace to struggling people, while differentiating His love for sinners from His clear teaching about sinful practices."

Conservative Quakers, those within Friends United Meeting and the Evangelical Friends International believe that sexual relations are condoned only in marriage, which they define to be between a man and a woman.

Confessional Lutheran churches teach that it is sinful to have homosexual desires, even if they do not lead to homosexual activity. The Doctrinal statement issued by the Wisconsin Evangelical Lutheran Synod states that making a distinction between homosexual orientation and the act of homosexuality is confusing:
 
However, confessional Lutherans also warn against selective morality which harshly condemns homosexuality while treating other sins more lightly.

Evangelical churches
The positions of the evangelical churches are varied, according to denominations. They range from liberal to fundamentalist or moderate Conservative and neutral. Some evangelical denominations have adopted neutral positions, leaving the choice to local churches to decide for same-sex marriage.

Evangelical Conservative position 
Conservative Evangelical Christians regard homosexual acts as sinful and think they should not be accepted by society. They tend to interpret biblical verses on homosexual acts to mean that the heterosexual family was created by God to be the bedrock of civilization and that same-sex relationships contradict God’s design for marriage and is not his will. Christians who oppose homosexual relationships sometimes argue that same-gender sexual activity is a sin.

In opposing interpretations of the Bible that are supportive of homosexual relationships, conservative Christians have argued for the reliability of the Bible, and the meaning of texts related to homosexual acts, while often seeing what they call the diminishing of the authority of the Bible by many homosexual authors as being ideologically driven.

As an alternative to a school-sponsored Day of Silence opposing bullying of LGBT students, conservative Christians organized a Golden Rule Initiative, where they passed out cards saying "As a follower of Christ, I believe that all people are created in the image of God and therefore deserve love and respect." Others created a Day of Dialogue to oppose what they believe is the silencing of Christian students who make public their opposition to homosexuality.

On 29 August 2017, the Council on Biblical Manhood and Womanhood released a manifesto on human sexuality known as the "Nashville Statement". The statement was signed by 150 evangelical leaders, and includes 14 points of belief.

Fundamentalist position 
It is in the fundamentalist conservative positions, that there are anti-gay activists on TV or radio who claim that homosexuality is the cause of many social problems, such as terrorism. Some evangelical churches in Uganda strongly oppose homosexuality and homosexuals. They have campaigned for laws criminalizing homosexuality. The generalization and use of prejudices to spread hatred of homosexual people are frequent.

Moderate position
Some churches have a moderate Conservative position. Although they do not approve homosexual practices, they show sympathy and respect for homosexuals. Churches thus see themselves as “welcoming, but not affirming”. This expression has its origin in the book Welcoming but Not Affirming: An Evangelical Response to Homosexuality published in 1998 by the American Baptist theologian Stanley Grenz.

Organizations 
The French Evangelical Alliance, a member of the European Evangelical Alliance and the World Evangelical Alliance, adopted on 12 October 2002, through its National Council, a document entitled Foi, espérance et homosexualité ("Faith, Hope and Homosexuality "), in which homophobia, hatred and rejection of homosexuals are condemned, but which denies homosexual practices and full church membership of unrepentant homosexuals and those who approve of these practices. In 2015, the Conseil national des évangéliques de France (French National Council of Evangelicals) reaffirmed its position on the issue by opposing marriage of same-sex couples, while not rejecting homosexuals, but wanting to offer them more than a blessing; an accompaniment and a welcome.

The French evangelical pastor Philippe Auzenet, a chaplain of the association Oser en parler, regularly intervenes on the subject in the media. It promotes dialogue and respect, as well as sensitization in order to better understand homosexuals. He also said in 2012 that Jesus would go to a gay bar, because he was going to all people with love.

Liberal position

International 
There are some international evangelical denominations that are gay-friendly, such as the Association of Welcoming and Affirming Baptists and Affirming Pentecostal Church International.

U.S. 
A 2014 survey reported that 43% of white evangelical American Christians between the ages of 18 and 33 supported same-sex marriage. Some evangelical churches accept homosexuality and celebrate gay weddings. The change in beliefs in favor of gay marriage in evangelical churches has certain consequences for them. Various churches thus received an excommunication from their Christian denomination for not respecting the confession of faith.  Other churches have faced significant departures of members from their congregations, seeing their financial resources diminish.

Neutral positions 
Some evangelical denominations have adopted neutral positions, leaving the choice to local churches to decide for same-sex marriage.

Denominational positions

Anabaptism 
Most Mennonite denominations hold a conservative position on homosexuality. 

The Brethren Mennonite Council for LGBT Interests was founded in 1976 in the USA and has member churches of different denominations in the USA and Canada. 

The Mennonite Church Canada leaves the choice to each church for same-sex marriage.

The Mennonite Church in the Netherlands and the Mennonite Church USA permit same-sex marriage.

Baptist 
Most Baptist denominations around the world hold a conservative view on homosexuality. The Southern Baptist Convention stated in 1996 that "even a desire to engage in a homosexual relationship is always sinful, impure, degrading, shameful, unnatural, indecent and perverted".

Some Baptist denominations in the United States do not have official beliefs about marriage in a confession of faith and invoke congregationalism to leave the choice to each church to decide.  This is the case of American Baptist Churches USA, Progressive National Baptist Convention, Cooperative Baptist Fellowship and National Baptist Convention, USA.

Some Baptist denominations support same-sex marriage. The Alliance of Baptists (USA),  the Aliança de Batistas do Brasil,  the Fraternidad de Iglesias Bautistas de Cuba,   and the Association of Welcoming and Affirming Baptists (international).

Pentecostalism 
Most Pentecostal denominations take a conservative stance on homosexuality. 

Various international denominations of the Gay Apostolic Pentecostals movement founded in the United States allow same-sex marriage.

Restorationist churches
Restorationist churches, such as Seventh-Day Adventists, generally teach that homosexuals are 'broken' and can be 'fixed'. Jehovah's Witnesses believe that "The Bible condemns sexual activity that is not between a husband and wife, whether it is homosexual or heterosexual conduct. (1 Corinthians 6:18) . . . While the Bible disapproves of homosexual acts, it does not condone hatred of homosexuals or homophobia. Instead, Christians are directed to “respect everyone.”​—1 Peter 2:17, Good News Translation."  The Church of Jesus Christ of Latter-day Saints said in 2015 that it officially welcomes its gay and lesbian members, if they choose sexual abstinence. The Community of Christ, a branch of Mormonism, fully accepts LGBT persons, performs weddings for gay and lesbian couples, and ordains LGBT members. Within the Stone-Campbell aligned restorationist churches the views are divergent. The churches of Christ (A Capella) and the Independent Christian Churches/Churches of Christ mostly adhere to a very conservative ideology; socially, politically, and religiously and are generally not accepting of openly LGBT members and will not perform weddings for gay and lesbian couples. The Disciples of Christ, is fully accepting of LGBT persons, often performs weddings for gay and lesbian couples, and ordains LGBT members. The United Church of Christ is an officially "open and affirming" church. Other Restorationist churches such as Millerite churches, have taken mixed positions but are increasingly accepting with some of their congregations fully accepting LGBT persons in all aspects of religious and political life.

Views supportive of homosexuality

In the 20th century, theologians like Jürgen Moltmann, Hans Küng, John Robinson, Bishop David Jenkins, Don Cupitt, and Bishop Jack Spong challenged traditional theological positions and understandings of the Bible; following these developments some have suggested that passages have been mistranslated or that they do not refer to what we understand as "homosexuality." Clay Witt, a minister in the Metropolitan Community Church, explains how theologians and commentators like John Shelby Spong, George Edwards and Michael England interpret injunctions against certain sexual acts as being originally intended as a means of distinguishing religious worship between Abrahamic and the surrounding pagan faiths, within which homosexual acts featured as part of idolatrous religious practices: "England argues that these prohibitions should be seen as being directed against sexual practices of fertility cult worship. As with the earlier reference from Strong’s, he notes that the word 'abomination' used here is directly related to idolatry and idolatrous practices throughout the Hebrew Testament. Edwards makes a similar suggestion, observing that 'the context of the two prohibitions in Leviticus 18:22 and Leviticus 20:13 suggest that what is opposed is not same-sex activity outside the cult, as in the modern secular sense, but within the cult identified as Canaanite'".

In 1986, the Evangelical and Ecumenical Women’s Caucus (EEWC), then known as the Evangelical Women's Caucus International, passed a resolution stating: "Whereas homosexual people are children of God, and because of the biblical mandate of Jesus Christ that we are all created equal in God's sight, and in recognition of the presence of the lesbian minority in EWCI, EWCI takes a firm stand in favor of civil rights protection for homosexual persons."

Some Christians believe that Biblical passages have been mistranslated or that these passages do not refer to LGBT orientation as currently understood. Liberal Christian scholars, like conservative Christian scholars, accept earlier versions of the texts that make up the Bible in Hebrew or Greek. However, within these early texts there are many terms that modern scholars have interpreted differently from previous generations of scholars. There are concerns with copying errors, forgery, and biases among the translators of later Bibles. They consider some verses such as those they say support slavery or the inferior treatment of women as not being valid today, and against the will of God present in the context of the Bible. They cite these issues when arguing for a change in theological views on sexual relationships to what they say is an earlier view. They differentiate among various sexual practices, treating rape, prostitution, or temple sex rituals as immoral and those within committed relationships as positive regardless of sexual orientation. They view certain verses, which they believe refer only to homosexual rape, as not relevant to consensual homosexual relationships.

Yale professor John Boswell has argued that a number of Early Christians entered into homosexual relationships, and that certain Biblical figures had homosexual relationships, such as Ruth and her mother-in-law Naomi, Daniel and the court official Ashpenaz, and David and King Saul's son Jonathan. Boswell has also argued that adelphopoiesis, a rite bonding two men, was akin to a religiously sanctioned same-sex union. Having partaken in such a rite, a person was prohibited from entering into marriage or taking monastic vows, and the choreography of the service itself closely parallelled that of the marriage rite. His views have not found wide acceptance, and opponents have argued that this rite sanctified a Platonic brotherly bond, not a homosexual union. He also argued that condemnation of homosexuality began only in the 12th century. Boswell's critics point out that many earlier doctrinal sources condemn homosexuality as a sin even if they do not prescribe a specific punishment, and that Boswell's arguments are based on sources which reflected a general trend towards harsher penalties, rather than a change in doctrine, from the 12th century onwards.

Desmond Tutu, the former Anglican Archbishop of Cape Town and a Nobel Peace Prize winner, has described homophobia as a "crime against humanity" and "every bit as unjust" as apartheid: "We struggled against apartheid in South Africa, supported by people the world over, because black people were being blamed and made to suffer for something we could do nothing about; our very skins. It is the same with sexual orientation. It is a given. ... We treat them [gays and lesbians] as pariahs and push them outside our communities. We make them doubt that they too are children of God – and this must be nearly the ultimate blasphemy. We blame them for what they are."

Modern gay Christian leader Justin R. Cannon promotes what he calls "Inclusive Orthodoxy" ('orthodoxy' in this sense is not to be confused with the Eastern Orthodox Church). He explains on his ministry website: "Inclusive Orthodoxy is the belief that the Church can and must be inclusive of LGBT individuals without sacrificing the Gospel and the Apostolic teachings of the Christian faith." Cannon's ministry takes a unique and distinct approach from modern liberal Christians while still supporting homosexual relations. His ministry affirms the divine inspiration of the Bible, the authority of Tradition, and says "...that there is a place within the full life and ministry of the Christian Church for lesbian, gay, bisexual, and transgender Christians, both those who are called to lifelong celibacy and those who are partnered."

Today, many religious people are becoming more affirming of same-sex relationships, even in denominations with official stances against homosexuality. In the United States, people in denominations who are against same-sex relationships are liberalizing quickly, though not as quickly as those in more affirming groups. This social change is creating tension within many denominations, and even schisms and mass walk-outs among Mormons and other conservative groups.

Pope Francis voiced support for same-sex civil unions during an interview in a documentary film, Francesco, which was premiered at the Rome Film Festival on 21 October 2020.

Homosexual Christians and organizations

Studies in the US show more LGBT individuals identify as Protestant than Catholic. George Barna, a conservative Christian author and researcher, conducted a survey in the United States in 2009 that found gay and lesbian people having a Christian affiliation were more numerous than had been presumed. He characterized some of his leading conclusions from the data as follows: "People who portray gay adults as godless, hedonistic, Christian bashers are not working with the facts. A substantial majority of gays cite their faith as a central facet of their life, consider themselves to be Christian, and claim to have some type of meaningful personal commitment to Jesus Christ active in their life today." Barna also found that LGBT people were more likely to interpret faith as an individual rather than a collective experience.

Candace Chellew-Hodge, liberal Christian lesbian founder of the online magazine Whosoever, responded to the findings: "All in all, I'm grateful for Barna even wandering into the subject of gay and lesbian religious belief. I think his study is important and can go a long way to dispelling the old "gays vs. God" dichotomy that too often gets played out in the media. However, his overall message is still harmful: Gays and lesbians are Christians – they're just not as good as straight ones." She argued that Barna had formulated his report with undue irony and skepticism, and that he had failed to take into account the reasons for the data which enkindled his "arrière pensée." The reason why far fewer homosexuals attend church, she argued, is that there are far fewer churches who will accept them. Equally, gays and lesbians do not see the Bible as unequivocally true because they are forced by its use against them to read it more closely and with less credulity, leading them to note its myriad contradictions.

Organizations for homosexual Christians exist across a wide range of beliefs and traditions. The interdenominational Q Christian Fellowship (formerly Gay Christian Network) has some members who affirm same-sex relationships and others who commit themselves to celibacy, groups it refers to as "Side A" and "Side B", respectively. According to founder Justin Lee, "We're just trying to get people together who experience attraction to the same sex, however they have handled that, and who love Jesus and say, OK, you are welcome here, and then let's pray together and figure out where God wants us to take it."

Some organizations cater exclusively to homosexual Christians who do not want to have gay sex, or attraction; the goals of these organizations vary. Some Christian groups focus on simply refraining from gay sex, such as Courage International and North Star. Other groups additionally encourage gay members to reduce or eliminate same-sex attractions. Love Won Out and the now-defunct Exodus International are examples of such ministries. These groups are sometimes referred to as ex-gay organizations, though many no longer use the term. Alan Chambers, the president of Exodus, says the term incorrectly implies a complete change in sexual orientation, though the group Parents and Friends of Ex-Gays and Gays continues to use the term. In addition, individual Christians identifying as gay who want to subscribe to the conservative ethic are becoming more vocal themselves.

Gay Christian writer and actor Peterson Toscano argues that organizations promoting orientation change are a "ruse". An organization he co-founded, Beyond Ex-Gay, supports people who feel they have been wounded by such organizations.

Other groups support or advocate for gay Christians and their relationships. For example, in the United States, IntegrityUSA represents the interests of lesbian and gay Christians in the Episcopal Church, while United Methodists have the Reconciling Ministries Network and evangelical Christians have Evangelicals Concerned. In 2014 the United Church of Christ filed a lawsuit challenging North Carolina’s ban on same-sex marriage, which is America’s first faith-based challenge to same-sex marriage bans; the Alliance of Baptists joined the lawsuit later that year.

In Europe, lesbian and gay evangelical Christians have a European forum. Working within the worldwide Anglican Communion on a range of discrimination issues, including those of LGBT clergy and people in the church, is Inclusive Church. The longest standing group for lesbian and gay Christians in the UK, founded in 1976, is the non-denominational Lesbian and Gay Christian Movement; specifically aimed to meet the needs of lesbian and gay evangelicals, there is the Evangelical Fellowship for Lesbian and Gay Christians; specifically working within the Church of England is Changing Attitude, which also takes an international focus in working for gay, lesbian, bisexual and transgender affirmation within the Anglican Communion.

Sociologist Richard N. Pitt argues that these organizations are only available to LGBT members of liberal denominations, as opposed to those in conservative denominations. His review of the literature on gay Christians suggests that these organizations not only represent the interests of Christians who attend their churches, but (like gay-friendly and gay-affirming churches) also give these members useful responses to homophobic and heterosexist rhetoric. His research shows that those LGBT Christians who stay at homophobic churches "kill the messenger" by attacking the minister's knowledge about homosexuality, personal morality, focus on sin instead of forgiveness, and motivations for preaching against homosexuality.

Movement of pro-celibacy gay Christians 
There is a movement of people who call themselves "gay Christians", but choose to practice celibacy. 
 The movement is often positioned against both liberals and conservatives. Recognizing themselves as gay or bisexual, these people believe that their attraction to same-sex people, while present, does not allow them to have homosexual relationships. They often say that their Christian conversion did not instantly change their sexual desires. They insist that the church should always reject homosexual practices, but that it should welcome gay people.

Ex-gay movement 
Various Christian organizations have been involved in the ex-gay movement. Love in Action, founded in 1973, was the first in the USA. In 1976, its members founded Exodus International, a Christian organization (more specifically Protestant and Evangelical) in United States and in various countries of the world. The Catholic organization Courage International was founded in 1980.

Conversion therapies for people wishing to change sexual orientation have been associated with the movement. Conversion therapy has been widely criticized and denounced by many major medical associations. Studies have found that LGB invididuals who experienced conversion therapy reported significantly higher rates of depression, suicide attempts, and substance abuse than their peers who did not.

See also

 Ex-gay movement
 Christianity and sexual orientation
 Homosexuality and religion
 Ellen Barrett – first openly lesbian priest (Episcopal) 
 Corpus Christi (play)
 Evangelical and Ecumenical Women's Caucus
 Gay bishops
 History of Christianity and homosexuality
 Homosexuality and Judaism
 Queer theology
 The Bible and homosexuality
 Homosexuality and Seventh-day Adventism

References

Further reading
 Bates, Stephen (2004). A Church at War: Anglicans and Homosexuality. I.B. Tauris. .
 Boswell, John (1980). Christianity, social tolerance, and homosexuality: Gay people in Western Europe from the beginning of the Christian era to the fourteenth century. University of Chicago Press. 
 Boswell, John (1979). The Church & the Homosexual
 Brug, John F. (2009), Doctrinal Brief: Is Homosexuality a Sin?, Wisconsin Lutheran Seminary Library
 Crompton, Louis, et al., (2003). Homosexuality and Civilization Massachusetts: The Belknap Press of Harvard University Press. 

Etengoff, C. & Daiute, C., (2014/5). Clinicians' perspectives of religious families' and gay men’s negotiation of sexual orientation disclosure and prejudice, Journal of Homosexuality 62(4). 
Etengoff, C. & Daiute, C. 2014/15). Online Coming Out Communications between Gay Men and their Religious Family Allies: A Family of Choice and Origin Perspective, Journal of GLBT Family Studies.
 Gagnon, Robert A.J. (2002). The Bible and Homosexual Practice: Texts and Hermeneutics. Abingdon Press. 
 Harvey, John F., O.S.F.S. (1996). The Truth about Homosexuality: The Cry of the Faithful, introduction by Benedict J. Groeschel, C.F.R.. Ignatius Press. .
 Hays, Katie; Chiasson, Susan A. (2021). Family of Origin, Family of Choice: Stories of Queer Christians. Michigan: Eerdmans Publishing. 
 Helminiak, Daniel A. (2000). "Frequently Asked Questions About Being Lesbian, Gay, Bisexual, or Transgender and Catholic" Dignity USA.
 Hildegard of Bingen (c. 1142). "Scivias," Columba Hart and Jane Bishop, translators; New York: Paulist Press, 1990
 Homosexuality and Christianity
 Johansson, Warren (1992). "Whosoever Shall Say To His Brother, Racha." Studies in Homosexuality, Vol XII: Homosexuality and Religion and Philosophy. Ed. Wayne Dynes & Stephen Donaldson. New York & London: Garland, pp. 212–214
 Mader, Donald (1992). "The Entimos Pais of Matthew 8:5–13 and Luke 7:1–10" Studies in Homosexuality, Vol XII: Homosexuality and Religion and Philosophy. Ed. Wayne Dynes & Stephen Donaldson. New York & London: Garland, pp. 223–235.
 

 Saletan, William (29 November 2005). "Gland Inquisitor". Slate.
 Smith, Morton (1992). "Clement of Alexandria and Secret Mark: The Score at the End of the First Decade." Studies in Homosexuality, Vol XII: Homosexuality and Religion and Philosophy. Ed. Wayne Dynes & Stephen Donaldson. New York & London: Garland, pp. 295–307

External links

 gaychurch.org — International database of LGB-friendly churches.

Christian ethics